Sorelianism is advocacy for or support of the ideology and thinking of French revolutionary syndicalist Georges Sorel. Sorelians oppose bourgeois democracy, the developments of the 18th century, the secular spirit, and the French Revolution, while supporting classical tradition. A revisionist interpretation of Marxism, Sorel believed that the victory of the proletariat in class struggle could be achieved only through the power of myth and a general strike. To Sorel, the aftermath of class conflict would involve rejuvenation of both the bourgeoisie and the proletariat. 

With the seeming failure of syndicalism, in 1910 he announced his abandonment of socialist literature and claimed in 1914, using an aphorism of Benedetto Croce that "socialism is dead" due to the "decomposition of Marxism". Sorel became a supporter of Maurrassian integral nationalism beginning in 1909, which he considered as having similar moral aims to syndicalism despite being enemies materially. In this sense, Sorelianism is considered to be a precursor to fascism. However, he became disillusioned with these ideas with World War I, and from 1918 until his death in 1922 he would be a supporter of the then Russian Revolution and communism, which he considered a revival of syndicalism.

Concepts

General strike and syndicalist society 
Although starting out as a Marxist, Sorel eventually rejected the Marxist elevation of history as determined. He considered the challenge of the rising social sciences to be new moral criterion. Proudhon had believed that a just society could only come about through action, and in particular opposition to an enemy; following this line Sorel believed that class war between the proletariat and the bourgeoisie would result from a general strike, which, together with the betterment of living conditions, he considered distinct from the mere aim of state distribution, and as the material and moral essence of Marxism and socialism.

However, he had problems with Proudhon, and Sorel seems to have sought to detach it of its idealism, as Proudhon had detached justice from power play; that is, from class relations. Otherwise only minimally influencing him, in admiration of Nietzsche Sorel held that an imperialist working class would establish a new aristocracy, "organizing relations among men for the benefit of its sovereignty" and as a sole source of law. However, he believed that proletarian violence would strengthen the bourgeoisie, and focused on the moral regeneration of society and the rescue of civilization rather than only the working-class, considering socialism a means for revolutionary transformation of society rather than a movement of the proletariat or a movement with a specific social structure.

Individualism and myth 
Sorel believed there to be a close relation between conflict and freedom. Inspired by liberal institutions and the pluralist writings of William James, Sorel denounced imitation of the military corps, extolling a warrior-individualism which he compared to the "American spirit", "animated with the spirit of liberty." He opposed the "splendid isolation" of totalitarian movements connecting all activities to party fronts.

Sorel considers the myth of the general strike a social basis for authority providing coherence to syndicalism. Against Nietzsche's Superman he compares the general strike with the "apocalyptic myths" or "Yankee Protestantism" of the practical, individualistic American settler ready for any venture. He considered that neither the former nor the latter impinge upon the freedom of the individual.

Against the idea of centralized Imperium he espouses a Proudhonian balance and devotion to the weak based on family love, which he believed needed to be part of the warrior ethic. Combined with an ethic of labour, it was this that would enable freedom.

Class conflict and class rejuvenation 
Sorel advocated the separation of groups in society, including support of the syndicalist model of a society where the proletarian workers would be autonomous and separate from bourgeois industrialists. Sorel refused the idea of negotiation between the classes during the period of struggle between the proletariat against the bourgeoisie. However, Sorel believed that it was the proletariat's task to awaken the bourgeoisie from intellectual stupor to recover its morality, "productive energy", and "feeling of its own dignity" that Sorel claimed had been lost because of democratic ideals.

Hence, Sorel believed that class conflict would in the end result in the rejuvenation of both the bourgeoisie and the proletariat.

Revision of Marxism, claims of "decomposition of Marxism" by Blanquism and positivism 
Sorel focused on the ethical dimension of Marxism, claiming its utility for historical analysis and a means for transforming society. However, Sorel criticized the deterministic, materialist, and mechanist components of Marxism. Sorel criticized vulgar interpretations of Marxism for being unfaithful to Marx's real intentions. Sorel claimed that Marx was not materialist at all, noting that Marx did not regard psychological developments of people as part of the economic process. Sorel noted that Marx described the necessary ideological superstructure of societies: law, the organization of the state, religion, art, and philosophy. As a result, Sorel claimed that "no great philosophy can be established without being based on art and on religion".

Sorel claimed that although Marx had initially denounced Pierre-Joseph Proudhon while supporting Blanquism, that Marx later synthesized ideas from both Blanquism and Proudhonism together. Sorel claimed that Marxism had undergone a crisis in the 1880s and the 1890s when major socialist parties were being founded in France. Sorel viewed non-Proudhonian socialism as being wrong-headed and corrupt, as being inherently oppressive. Sorel claimed that a "decomposition of Marxism", as referring to the major goals and themes of the ideology, was being caused by Marx's Blanquist elements and Engels' positivist elements.

Proudhonism was in Sorel's view, more consistent with the goals of Marxism than Blanquism which had become popular in France, and Sorel claimed that Blanquism was a vulgar and rigidly deterministic corruption of Marxism.

Sorelianism and French integral nationalism 
Interest in Sorelian thought arose in the French political right, particularly by French nationalist Charles Maurras of Action Française and his supporters. While Maurras was a staunch opponent of Marxism, he was supportive of Sorelianism for its opposition to liberal democracy. Maurras famously stated "a socialism liberated from the democratic and cosmopolitan element fits nationalism well as a well made glove fits a beautiful hand". In the summer of 1909, Sorel endorsed French integral nationalism and praised Maurras. Sorel was impressed by the significant numbers of "ardent youth" that enrolled in Action Française. Sorel's turn to nationalism resulted in his disregarding of Marx in favour of the views of Pierre-Joseph Proudhon. In 1910, Sorel along with Action Française nationalists Édouard Berth and Georges Valois agreed to form a journal titled La Cité française that would promote a form of national-socialism, however this was abandoned. Afterwards, Sorel supported another nationalist newspaper, L'Indépendence and began writing anti-Semitic content claiming that France was under attack from "Jewish invaders". In 1911, on the issue of Sorelian syndicalism, Valois announced to the Fourth Congress of Action Française that "It was not a mere accident that our friends encountered the militants of syndicalism. The nationalist movement and the syndicalist movement, alien to another though they may seem, because of their present positions and orientations, have more than one common objective."

During his association with French nationalism, Sorel joined Valois in the Cercle Proudhon, an organization that Valois declared to provide "a common platform for nationalists and leftist antidemocrats". The organization recognized both Proudhon and Sorel as two great thinkers who had "prepared the meeting of the two French traditions that had opposed each other throughout the nineteenth century: nationalism and authentic socialism uncorrupted by democracy, represented by syndicalism". Cercle Proudhon announced that it supported the replacement of bourgeois ideology and democratic socialism with a new ethic of an alliance of nationalism with syndicalism, as those "two synthesizing and convergent movements, one at the extreme right and the other at the extreme left, that have begun the siege and assault on democracy". Cercle Proudhon supported the replacement of the liberal order with a new world that was "virile, heroic, pessimistic, and puritanical—based on the sense of duty and sacrifice: a world where the mentality of warriors and monks would prevail". The society would be dominated by a powerful avant-garde proletarian elite that would serve as an aristocracy of producers, and allied with intellectual youth dedicated to action against the decadent bourgeoisie.

Sorelianism and Italian Fascism 
Upon Sorel's death, an article in the Italian Fascist doctrinal review Gerarchia edited by Benito Mussolini and Agostino Lanzillo, a known Sorelian, declared "Perhaps fascism may have the good fortune to fulfill a mission that is the implicit aspiration of the whole oeuvre of the master of syndicalism: to tear away the proletariat from the domination of the Socialist party, to reconstitute it on the basis of spiritual liberty, and to animate it with the breath of creative violence. This would be the true revolution that would mold the forms of the Italy of tomorrow."

Notable adherents 
Aside from Sorel himself, there were a number of adherents of Sorelianism in the early 20th century. Sorel was a mentor to Hubert Lagardelle who, like Sorel, supported the segregation of social classes and who despised the bourgeoisie, democracy, democratic socialism, parliamentarism, social democracy, and universal suffrage. Antonio Gramsci was influenced by the Sorelian views of social myth. Based on influence from Sorel, Gramsci asserted that Italy and the West have suffered from crises of culture and authority due to the "wave of materialism" and the inability of liberalism to achieve consensus and hegemony over society. Sorel was a major influence on the early works of György Lukács, though Lukács later dismissed Sorel as petty bourgeoisie. Sorel influenced Greek philosopher Nikos Kazantzakis in Kazantzakis' belief of strife as being creative while viewing peace as decadent. José Carlos Mariátegui was a Sorelian who claimed that Vladimir Lenin was a Sorelian and Nietzschean hero.

Benito Mussolini, when he was a Marxist, held various positions towards Sorelianism at times. Mussolini stated that he became a syndicalist during the 1904 Italian general strike; his close contact with syndicalists dates to 1902. Mussolini reviewed Sorel's Reflections on Violence in 1909 and supported Sorel's view of consciousness as being a part of protracted struggle, where people display uplifting and self-sacrificing virtues akin to the heroes of antiquity. Mussolini also supported the Sorelian view of the necessity of violence in revolution. He followed Sorel in denouncing humanitarianism and compromise between revolutionary socialists and reformist socialists and bourgeois democrats. By 1909, Mussolini supported elitism and anti-parliamentarism, and became a propagandist for the use of "regenerative violence". When Sorelians initially began to come close to identifying themselves with nationalism and monarchism in 1911, Mussolini believed that such association would destroy their credibility as socialists.

References

Citations

Works cited 

 Peter Bien. Kazantzakis: politics of the spirit, Volume 2. Princeton, New Jersey: Princeton University Press, 2007.
 Hans Dam Christensen, Øystein Hjort, Niels Marup Jensen. Rethinking art between the wars: new perspectives in art history. Aarhus, Denmark: Museum Tusculanum Press, 2001.
 Jean L. Cohen, Andrew Arato. Civil society and political theory. Massachusetts Institute of Technology, 1994.
 Stephen Gill. Power and resistance in the new world order. New York: Palgrave Macmillan, 2003.
 Anthony James Gregor, University of California, Berkeley. Young Mussolini and the intellectual origins of fascism. Berkeley and Los Angeles, California: University of California Press, 1979.
 John Hellman. The communitarian third way: Alexandre Marc's ordre nouveau, 1930–2000. McGill-Queen's University Press, 2002.
 Douglas R. Holmes. Integral Europe: fast-capitalism, multiculturalism, neofascism. Princeton, New Jersey: Princeton University Press, 2000.
 Manus I. Midlarsky. Origins of Political Extremism: Mass Violence in the Twentieth Century and Beyond. Cambridge University Press, 2011.
 Ofelia Schutte. Cultural identity and social liberation in Latin American thought. Albany, New York: State University of New York Press, 1993.
 John Stanley. Mainlining Marx. New Brunswick, New Jersey: Transaction Publishers, 2002.
 
 Zeev Sternhell. Neither right nor left: fascist ideology in France. 2nd edition. Princeton, New Jersey: Princeton University Press, 1986.
 Zeev Sternhell, Mario Sznajder, Maia Ashéri. The Birth of Fascist Ideology: From Cultural Rebellion to Political Revolution. Princeton, New Jersey: Princeton University Press, 1994.
 Robert Stuart. Marxism and National Identity: Socialism, Nationalism, and National Socialism during the French fin de siècle. Albany, New York: State University of New York Press, 2006.

Fascism
Marxism
Political ideologies
Eponymous economic ideologies
Eponymous political ideologies
Revolutionary Syndicalism
National syndicalism

See also 
 Georges Sorel
 National syndicalism
 Charles Maurras
 Benito Mussolini
 Italian fascism